Lisa Ann Karčić (born November 11, 1986 in New York City) is a Croatian American former professional basketball player. She was a member of the Croatian national team and competed with the team at the 2012 Summer Olympics. In 2011, she won the Icelandic championship with Keflavík.

Villanova statistics

Source

Club career

Nordic leagues
Karčić joined Naisten Korisliiga club Keravan Energia Team prior to the 2010–2011 season. Although the club finished last in the standings she enjoyed a fine season statistical wise. In her last regular season game in Finland, she just missed out on a quadruple double with 26 points, 23 rebounds, 10 steals and 9 assists. For the season she averaged 18.6 points, 12.1 rebounds, 5.5 steals, 3.3 assists and 1.8 blocks. She led the league in steals and came in third in rebounds, assists and blocks.

Shortly after the Finnish season ended, Karčić joined Icelandic Úrvalsdeild powerhouse Keflavík for the 2011 Icelandic playoffs after an injury to starter, and former Villanova Wildcats teammate, Jacquline Adamshick. Her first game was game 3 in Keflavík's semi-finals matchup against KR where Keflavík came out on top. Keflavík edged out KR with a victory in game 4 of the series and advanced to the finals against Njarðvík. On April 3, Karčić scored a buzzer beater to defeat Njarðvík in game 1 of the finals. For the game she had 15 points, 9 rebounds and 9 steals. Keflavík went on to win game 2 and 3, sweeping Njarðvík from the finals. In five playoffs games, Karčić averaged 11.0 points, 12.6 rebounds, 4.8 steals and 3.2 blocks.

Spain
Karčić spent two seasons in the Spanish 	Liga Femenina, playing for Zamarat in 2011–2012 and for Hondarribia-Irun 2012–2013.

Croatian national basketball team
Although born in the United States, Karčić holds a Croatian passport. Her first games for the Croatian national team where at the EuroBasket Women 2011. Her best contribution was in the match against Latvia (best rebounder, 7 rebounds) and against Montenegro (8 rebounds). At the 2012 Summer Olympics, Karčić competed again for the national team in the women's basketball event.

Career
  New Hyde Park High School (? - 2004)
  Villanova Wildcats (2005–2009)
  AEL Limassol (2009–2010)
  Leones Ponce (2010)
  Keravan (2010–2011)
  Keflavík (2011)
  Zamarat (2011–2012)
  Hondarribia-Irun (2012–2013)
  ŽKK Novi Zagreb (2013-2014)

Awards and achievements
 1,897 points in high school career 
 twice named Nassau player of the year 
 three-time All-Long Island selection
 three-time All-State selection
 MVP of the state tournament when she led the Gladiators to the title
 best in three-point field goals in Villanova, two years in a row

Finland
Naisten Korisliiga steals leader (2011)

Iceland
Icelandic league champion (2011)

Spain
 Defensive player of the year (2012)

References

External links
Eurobasket Women 2011 Lisa Karcic
Profile at eurobasket.com
Naisten Korisliiga stats at basket.fi
Úrvalsdeild stats at kki.is
2012 Olympic profile at fiba.com
Villanova Wildcats - Lisa  Karcic profile at villanova.com
Liga Femenina statistics at feb.es

1986 births
American expatriate basketball people in Iceland
American women's basketball players
Basketball players at the 2012 Summer Olympics
Croatian Women's Basketball League players
Croatian women's basketball players
Leones de Ponce basketball players
Living people
Basketball players from New York City
Power forwards (basketball)
Olympic basketball players of Croatia
Úrvalsdeild kvenna basketball players
ŽKK Novi Zagreb players
Keflavík women's basketball players
21st-century American women